The Church of Santa María del Salvador (Spanish: Iglesia Arciprestal de Santa María del Salvador) is a Roman Catholic church located in Chinchilla de Monte-Aragón, Spain. It was declared Bien de Interés Cultural in 1922.

Construction of the church, using designs by Juan Pacheco, Marqués de Villena, began in the 15th century. The church however has multiple styles, including a gothic portal, renaissance façade, and baroque interiors. The 16th-century metalwork by Antón de Viveros, races the main chapel.

References 

Santa Maria del Salvador
Bien de Interés Cultural landmarks in the Province of Albacete
Gothic architecture in Castilla–La Mancha
16th-century Roman Catholic church buildings in Spain